The Language Technologies Institute (LTI) is a research institute at Carnegie Mellon University in Pittsburgh, Pennsylvania, United States, and focuses on the area of language technologies. The institute is home to 33 faculty with the primary scholarly research of the institute focused on machine translation, speech recognition, speech synthesis, information retrieval, parsing, information extraction, and multimodal machine learning. Until 1996, the institute existed as the Center for Machine Translation, which was established in 1986. Subsequently, from 1996 onwards, it started awarding degrees, and the name was changed to The Language Technologies Institute. The institute was founded by Professor Jaime Carbonell, who served as director until his death in February 2020.  He was followed by Jamie Callan, and then Carolyn Rosé, as interim directors.

Academic programs
The institute currently offers two Ph.D. programs, four different types of master degrees and an undergraduate minor.  The master's programs each offer a different focus or career target.  The Master of Language Technologies (MLT) is a research-focused masters in which students take all the same classes as Ph.D. students, and are frequently funded through sponsored research projects.  In effect, this means they work on grants with faculty the same as Ph.D. students, so most transition to Ph.D. programs after completion.  The MLT serves as a bridging masters for students from non-traditional backgrounds or with limited research experience in language technologies.  In contrast, the Master of Science in Intelligent Information Systems (MIIS), Master of Computational Data Science (MCDS), and Master of Science in Artificial Intelligence and Innovation (MSAII) focus more heavily on coursework and projects that prepare students for industry jobs.  The MIIS and MCDS programs are also targeted at shorter (e.g. 16 month) completion times and require an industry internship during the program.

Faculty
Notable faculty include Alan W Black (Speech), Louis-Philippe Morency (Multimodal Machine Learning), Scott Fahlman (Knowledge Representation), 
Graham Neubig (Machine Translation), Justine Cassell, Eduard Hovy, Eric Nyberg, and Eric Xing.

Spinoffs and Affiliated Companies

Safaba Translation Systems
Co-founded by LTI faculty member Alon Lavie in 2009, Safaba was acquired in 2015 by Amazon and incorporated into the company's Pittsburgh offices. Once incorporated into Amazon's corporate structure, the Safaba team became known as the Amazon Machine Translation R&D Group, and would go on to contribute to the development of Amazon Alexa.

CognistX
Co-founded by LTI Professor and MCDS program director Eric Nyberg, CognistX is an adaptive AI company that collaborates with organizations across sectors to harness the power of machine learning and artificial intelligence. The company's projects include work in targeted advertising, oil and gas, and psychedelic drug research.

See also 
Machine Learning Department at Carnegie Mellon University
Human Computer Interaction Institute at Carnegie Mellon University
School of Computer Science at Carnegie Mellon University

References

External links 
Language Technologies Institute Official Website
Speech Group at Carnegie Mellon
ISL at Carnegie Mellon
Center for Machine Translation

Schools and departments of Carnegie Mellon
Linguistics organizations
Computational linguistics
Translation organizations